Kalahjah (also Romanized as Kalahjāh; also known as Kalajāh) is a village in Bavil Rural District, in the Central District of Osku County, East Azerbaijan Province, Iran.

External links

Kalajah Official News Media

• Instagram

• Telegram Messenger

References 
‌ ‌‌2. Kalajah Official News Media

Populated places in Osku County